Alan Niven is a New Zealand-born band manager best known for his tenure as manager of Guns N' Roses and Great White.

Biography 
Niven became the manager of Guns N' Roses, serving from 1986 to 1991. He was fired from his post just prior to the release of Use Your Illusion. According to a 1991 cover story by Rolling Stone magazine, frontman Axl Rose forced the dismissal of Niven (against the wishes of some of his band-mates) by refusing to complete the albums until he was replaced.

Niven has also been a manager of Buck & Evans, Great White, and associated with Virgin Records, Enigma Records, Mötley Crüe, Berlin, Dokken, Clarence Clemons, The Angels [from Angel City], Havana Black, The Michael Thompson Band [MTB], Izzy Stradlin and The JuJu Hounds, Razer and Storm of Perception.

References 

People from Wellington City
New Zealand record producers
Living people
Guns N' Roses
Year of birth missing (living people)